The 1911 Montana football team represented the University of Montana in the 1911 college football season. They were led by second-year head coach Robert H. Cary, and finished the season with a record of two wins and one loss (2–1).

Schedule

References

Montana
Montana Grizzlies football seasons
Montana football